The Memphis Press-Scimitar was an afternoon newspaper based in Memphis, Tennessee, United States, and owned by the E. W. Scripps Company.

Created from a merger in 1926 between the Memphis Press and the Memphis News-Scimitar, the newspaper ceased publication in 1983. It was the main rival to The Commercial Appeal, also based in Memphis and owned by Scripps.  At the time of its closure, the Press-Scimitar had lost a third of its circulation in 10 years and was down to daily sales of 80,000 copies.

From 1906 to 1931, The Memphis Press was edited by founder Ross B. Young, a journalist from Ohio brought down by local business interests looking for a voice to speak to the stranglehold that E. H. "Boss" Crump had on city government, employment, and contracts.

From 1931 to 1962, The Press-Scimitar was edited by Edward J. Meeman.

History
The Memphis Evening Scimitar was published from at least 1891 to 1904. It was partly owned by Memphis merchant tycoon Napoleon Hill who commissioned the Scimitar Building in 1902. Memphis architects August A. Chigazola (1869-1911) and William J. Hanker (1876–1958) designed it. Hill, known as Memphis' original "merchant prince", lived on the other side of Madison Avenue in a mansion on the site where the Sterick Building is now. Hill's are on the façade of the building.

The paper condemned U.S. president Theodore Roosevelt's dinner with Booker T. Washington (Booker T. Washington dinner at the White House).

In fiction
In John Grisham's novel The Client, the Memphis Press is fictionally presented as still existing and flourishing as a major Memphis paper into the 1990s.

In the 2004 movie The Ladykillers, during the basement scene where Tom Hanks's character Professor Goldthwaite Higginson Dorr describes forming the crew for the heist, he references having posted an ad in the Memphis Scimitar, which the would-be thieves responded to.

The 2013 Newberry Award winning novel Paperboy by former Press Scimitar copy editor Vilas Vince Vawter has its main character working as a paper carrier delivering the Press Scimitar. A second novel, Copyboy, published in 2018, has the same character working as a copyboy in the paper's newsroom.

See also
 List of newspapers in Tennessee

References

Further reading 
 "Memphis Press-Scimitar Rolls Final Edition Today", Associated Press via Ocala Star-Banner, October 31, 1983.
 "Memphis Paper Quits.; Evening Appeal Is Consolidated With The Commercial Appeal", The New York Times, July 1, 1933. 
 Frank, Ed. "The History", Memphis Press-Scimitar. Retrieved November 7, 2010. Archived by WebCite on 7 November 2010. [Text is identical to the Tennessee Encyclopedia.]

Daily newspapers published in the United States
Defunct newspapers published in Tennessee
Mass media in Memphis, Tennessee
Publications established in 1926
Publications disestablished in 1983
1926 establishments in Tennessee
Former E. W. Scripps Company subsidiaries
1983 disestablishments in Tennessee